Oxopropalines are novel cytocidal beta-carbolines isolated from Streptomyces.

References

Beta-Carbolines